The Canon EF 22–55mm 4–5.6 USM lens is a consumer grade lens that has now been discontinued. It was originally released in February 1998, as one of two kit lenses for the Canon EOS IX Lite, an APS-format film SLR, although it is also fully compatible with Canon's 35mm film SLRs, and subsequent APS-C and full-frame DSLRs.

The EF 22–55mm lens starts off at an APS camera wide (35mm – 35 mm equivalent focal length) and ends at short telephoto (88mm – 35 mm equivalent focal length). This lens was designed to complement the EF 55–200mm f/4.5-5.6 USM, also designed for the IX-series SLR's.

This lens, being one of the older lenses, is enjoying a renaissance along with other EF/FD/FL lenses that can be purchased second-hand and used on a mirrorless camera via an adapter. This is a cheaper method for APS-C Cameras of obtaining a 'kit' lens equivalent (35–90mm 35 mm equivalent focal length for digital), offering almost the range of an 18–55mm kit lens.

References

This is an ideal lens for The EOS 1 D Mark 1,2,3 and 4 as it's 22–55 on the 1.3 crop hybrid sensor is 27–71 mm

Canon EF lenses
Camera lenses introduced in 1998